Pielgrzymka may refer to the following places in Poland:
Pielgrzymka, Lower Silesian Voivodeship (south-west Poland)
Pielgrzymka, Lublin Voivodeship (east Poland)
Pielgrzymka, Subcarpathian Voivodeship (south-east Poland)